Leonardo Moracci (born 22 August 1987) is an Italian footballer who plays for Serie D club ASD Cannara.

Biography
Born in Todi, Umbria, central Italy, Moracci started his career at hometown club Todi at Serie D where the team relegated in 2004. In August 2004 he was signed by northern Italy side Chievo. In 2006–07 season he left on loan to Serie D side Pro Belvedere Vercelli then Serie C2 side Sansovino (along with Marcus N'Ze, Xhulian Rrudho, Antonino Saviano, Luca Spinetti and Maycol Andriani). But he was returned in January 2008 and played for Primavera team as overage player.

In 2008–09 season, he left for Lega Pro Prima Divisione side Hellas Verona F.C. (and cross-town rival) in co-ownership deal (along with Stefano Garzon, Marco Parolo and Domenico Girardi who went on loan) but bought back along with Parolo in June 2009.

He trained with Chievo's Primavera U20 team and was not offered a number in the first team at the first half of the 2009–10 season. In January 2010, he left for Alessandria of Prima Divisione in another co-ownership deal.

In June 2010 Chievo bought back Moracci for a peppercorn fee of €500 and re-sold him to Lecco for free, re-joining Tommaso Chiecchi who sold to Lecco a month earlier.

After a season with the amateur hometown club, he was signed by Portogruaro and was in the pre-season camp.

References

External links
 Profile at FIGC 
 Profile at AIC.Football.it 
 
 

1987 births
Living people
People from Todi
Italian footballers
A.C. ChievoVerona players
A.C. Sansovino players
Hellas Verona F.C. players
U.S. Alessandria Calcio 1912 players
Calcio Lecco 1912 players
A.S.D. Portogruaro players
Paganese Calcio 1926 players
S.S. Ischia Isolaverde players
Montevarchi Calcio Aquila 1902 players
Serie C players
Serie D players
Association football defenders
Footballers from Umbria
Sportspeople from the Province of Perugia